The 2014 FIVB Volleyball Men's World Championship featured 24 teams. One place was allocated to the hosts, Poland, but no automatic place is given to the defending champions, Brazil. The remaining 23 places were determined by a qualification process, in which entrants from among the other teams from the five FIVB confederations competed.

Qualified teams

1.Competed as Soviet Union from 1949 to 1990; 6th appearance as Russia.
2.Competed as West Germany from 1956 to 1966; 4th appearance as Germany.
3.Competed as SFR Yugoslavia from 1956 to 1970 and Serbia and Montenegro (FR Yugoslavia) from 1998 to 2006; 2nd appearance as Serbia.

Confederation qualification processes
The distribution by confederation for the 2014 FIVB Volleyball Men's World Championship was:

 Asia and Oceania (AVC): 4 places
 Africa (CAVB): 3 places
 Europe (CEV): 8 places (+ Poland qualified automatically as host nation for a total of 9 places)
 South America (CSV): 3 places
 North America (NORCECA): 5 places

AVC

  (Zonal Round)
  (Final Round)
  (Subzonal Round, Zonal Round, Final Round)
  (Final Round)
  (Zonal Round, Final Round)
  (Zonal Round)
  (Zonal Round, Final Round)
  (Zonal Round, Final Round)
  (Final Round)
  (Subzonal Round, Zonal Round)
  (Final Round)
  (Subzonal Round)
  (Zonal Round, Final Round)
  (Subzonal Round, Zonal Round, Final Round)
  (Subzonal Round, Zonal Round)
  (Zonal Round)
  (Zonal Round)
  (Final Round)
  (Zonal Round, Final Round)
  (Subzonal Round, Zonal Round, Final Round)
  (Subzonal Round, Zonal Round, Final Round)
  (Final Round)
  (Zonal Round)
  (Subzonal Round)
  (Zonal Round, Final Round)
  (Subzonal Round)
  (Zonal Round)
  (Zonal Round)

CAVB

  (Subzonal Round, Zonal Round, Final Round)
  (Subzonal Round, Zonal Round, Final Round)
  (Subzonal Round, Zonal Round)
  (Subzonal Round, Zonal Round)
  (Subzonal Round, Zonal Round, Final Round)
  (Subzonal Round, Final Round)
  (Subzonal Round, Zonal Round)
  (Subzonal Round, Zonal Round, Final Round)
  (Subzonal Round, Zonal Round, Final Round)
  (Subzonal Round, Zonal Round, Final Round)
  (Subzonal Round, Zonal Round)
  (Subzonal Round)
  (Subzonal Round, Zonal Round, Final Round)
  (Subzonal Round, Zonal Round)
  (Subzonal Round)
  (Subzonal Round)
  (Subzonal Round, Zonal Round)
  (Subzonal Round, Zonal Round)
  (Subzonal Round, Zonal Round)
  (Subzonal Round, Zonal Round)
  (Subzonal Round, Zonal Round, Final Round)
  (Subzonal Round, Zonal Round, Final Round)
  (Subzonal Round, Zonal Round, Final Round)
  (Subzonal Round, Zonal Round, Final Round)
  (Subzonal Round, Zonal Round, Final Round)
  (Subzonal Round)
  (Subzonal Round)
  (Subzonal Round)
  (Subzonal Round)
  (Subzonal Round, Zonal Round, Final Round)
  (Subzonal Round, Zonal Round)
  (Subzonal Round, Zonal Round, Final Round)
  (Subzonal Round, Zonal Round)

CEV

  (2013 European Championship) (First Round)
  (2013 European Championship)
  (2013 European Championship) (First Round)
  (First Round)
  (2013 European Championship) (First Round, Second Round, Third Round)
  (2013 European Championship) (First Round, Third Round)
  (First Round)
  (2013 European Championship) (Third Round)
  (2013 European Championship) (First Round, Third Round)
  (2013 European Championship) (First Round, Third Round)
  (2013 European Championship) (Third Round)
  (2013 European Championship) (First Round)
  (2013 European Championship) (First Round, Third Round)
  (2013 European Championship) (Third Round)
  (2013 European Championship) (Third Round)
  (2013 European Championship) (Third Round)
  (2013 European Championship)
  (2013 European Championship) (First Round, Third Round)
  (2013 European Championship) (First Round)
  (First Round)
  (2013 European Championship) (First Round, Second Round)
  (2013 European Championship)
  (2013 European Championship) (First Round)
  (2013 European Championship) (First Round)
  (2013 European Championship) (First Round, Third Round)
  (First Round)
  (2013 European Championship) (First Round)
  (2013 European Championship) (First Round, Second Round, Third Round)
  (First Round)
  (First Round)
  (2013 European Championship) (Third Round)
  (2013 European Championship) (First Round, Second Round)
  (2013 European Championship)
  (First Round)
  (First Round)
  (2013 European Championship) (Third Round)
  (2013 European Championship) (Third Round)
  (2013 European Championship) (First Round, Third Round)
  (2013 European Championship) (Third Round)
  (2013 European Championship) (First Round, Second Round)
  (2013 European Championship)
  (2013 European Championship) (Third Round)
  (2013 European Championship) (First Round, Second Round, Third Round)

CSV

  (2013 South American Championship)
  (2013 South American Championship)
  (2013 South American Championship, Qualification Tournament)
  (2013 South American Championship, Qualification Tournament)
  (2013 South American Championship, Qualification Tournament)
  (Qualification Tournament)

NORCECA

  (First Round, Second Round)
  (First Round, Second Round)
  (First Round, Second Round)
  (First Round, Second Round, Third Round)
  (First Round, Second Round, Third Round)
  (First Round)
  (First Round)
  (First Round, Second Round)
  (Third Round)
  (First Round)
  (First Round, Second Round, Third Round, Final Round)
  (Third Round)
  (First Round, Second Round)
  (First Round, Second Round)
  (First Round, Second Round, Third Round, Final Round)
  (First Round, Second Round)
  (First Round, Second Round)
  (First Round, Second Round)
  (First Round, Second Round, Third Round, Final Round)
  (First Round, Second Round, Third Round)
  (First Round, Second Round, Third Round)
  (First Round)
  (First Round, Second Round)
  (Third Round)
  (First Round)
  (First Round, Second Round)
  (First Round, Second Round, Third Round)
  (Third Round, Final Round)
  (First Round, Second Round)
  (First Round, Second Round, Third Round)
  (First Round, Second Round)
  (First Round, Second Round)
  (First Round)
  (First Round)
  (First Round, Second Round, Third Round)
  (Third Round)
  (First Round)
  (First Round)
  (Third Round)

References

External links
Official website of the 2014 World Championship Qualification CAVB
Official website of the 2014 World Championship Qualification CEV
Official website of the 2014 World Championship Qualification NORCECA Third and Final Round
Official website of the 2014 World Championship Qualification NORCECA Second Round
Official website of the 2014 World Championship Qualification NORCECA First Round

2014 FIVB Volleyball Men's World Championship
FIVB Volleyball World Championship qualification